The men's discus throw event at the 1959 Summer Universiade was held at the Stadio Comunale di Torino in Turin on 4 and 5 September 1959.

Medalists

Results

Qualification
Qualification mark: 44.00 metres

Final

References

Athletics at the 1959 Summer Universiade
1959